CKNX may refer to:

 CKNX (AM), a radio station (920 AM) licensed to Wingham, Ontario, Canada
 CKNX-FM, a radio station (101.7 FM) licensed to Wingham, Ontario, Canada
 CKNX-TV, a defunct television station (channel 8) formerly licensed to Wingham, Ontario, Canada (now a repeater of CFPL-TV, a television station licensed to London, Ontario, Canada)